The 1992 Torneo Internazionale Femminile di Palermo was a women's tennis tournament played on outdoor clay courts at the Country Time Club in Palermo, Italy that was part of the Tier V category of the 1992 WTA Tour. It was the fifth edition of the tournament and was held from 6 July until 12 July 1992. First-seeded Mary Pierce won the singles title and earned $18,000 first-prize money.

Finals

Singles
 Mary Pierce defeated  Brenda Schultz 6–1, 6–7(3–7), 6–1
 It was Pierce's 2nd singles title of the year and the 3rd of her career.

Doubles
 Halle Cioffi /  María José Gaidano defeated  Petra Langrová /  Ana Segura 6–3, 4–6, 6–3

References

External links
 ITF tournament edition details
 Tournament draws

Internazionali Femminili di Palermo
Internazionali Femminili di Palermo
1992 in Italian women's sport
Palermo
Torneo